Trepidulus is a genus of band-winged grasshoppers in the family Acrididae. There are at least three described species in Trepidulus.

Species
These three species belong to the genus Trepidulus:
 Trepidulus concinens Otte, 1984
 Trepidulus hyalinus (Scudder, 1900) (Scudder's clearwinged grasshopper)
 Trepidulus rosaceus (Scudder, 1900) (shy rose-winged grasshopper)

References

Further reading

 
 

Oedipodinae
Articles created by Qbugbot